Monique de Bruin (born May 12, 1977) is a retired American fencer who won a silver medal in the team foil at the 1995 Pan American Games. She won the NCAA Fencing Championships in the individual foil in 1999, and finished second in 2000.

References

1977 births
Living people
American female foil fencers
Fencers from Portland, Oregon
Pan American Games silver medalists for the United States
Pan American Games medalists in fencing
Fencers at the 1995 Pan American Games
Medalists at the 1995 Pan American Games
21st-century American women